The Excellence Research Centers are national networks of research groups in Colombia who pursue a common problem in a scientific and technological area of national strategic importance.  The centers are part of the national public policy for the promotion of research through the creation or strengthening of national research programs in complex and priority subjects that require interdisciplinary, interinstitutional, intersectoral, and international collaboration.  The centers are funded by COLCIENCIAS and participating universities and institutions.

There are seven participating centers in Colombia:

 Biodiversity and Genetic Resources Research and Studies Center (CIEBREG)
 National Research Center for the Agroindustrialization of Aromatic and Medicinal Tropical Vegetable Species (CENIVAM)
 Colombian Research Center in Tuberculosis (CCITB)
 Excellence Center for Novel Materials (CENM)
 Excellence Center for Modeling and Simulation of Complex Phenomena and Processes (CEIBA)
 Colombian Observatory for the Development, the Citizen Convivency, and the Institutional Strengthening in Regions strongly affected by Armed Conflict (ODECOFI)
 Colombian Center for Genomics and Bioinformatics of Extreme Environments (GeBix)

Notes

External links 
 CIEBREG official site 
 CENIVAM official site 
 CENM official site 
 CEIBA official site 
 ODECOFI official site 
 GeBix official site 

Science and technology in Colombia
Scientific organisations based in Colombia